This is list of episodes for BBC One period drama When the Boat Comes In which aired four seasons consisting of 51 episodes between 1976 and 1981.

Regular cast 

"Jack" [John] Ford – James Bolam
Jessie Seaton – Susan Jameson
"Bill" [William] Seaton – James Garbutt
"Bella" [Isabella] May Seaton – Jean Heywood
Tom Seaton – John Nightingale
Mary Seaton [nee Routledge] – Michelle Newell [until "Paddy Boyle's Discharge"]
Billy Seaton – Edward Wilson
Matt Headley – Malcolm Terris
Dolly Ford née Headley – Madelaine Newton [Introduced in "Fish and Woolly Jumpers"]
Sir Horatio Manners – Basil Henson [Introduced in "Swords and Pick Handles"]
Arthur Ashton – Geoffrey Rose [Introduced in "Empire Day on the Slag Heap"]

Regular crew 
Series Created by James Mitchell
Theme Music: David Fanshawe – Sung by Alex Glasgow
Script Editor: William Humble
Producer: Leonard Lewis

Series 1

Series 2

Series 3

Series 4 

The opening and closing credits for the final series were different from those of the other three, reflecting Jack's relocation to London.

Notes 

When the Boat Comes In